Earthly Delights may refer to:

 Earthly Delights (record label), a UK record label
 Earthly Delights (computer game), a text adventure game for the Apple II
 Earthly Delights, the fifth album by noise rock band Lightning Bolt.

See also
The Garden of Earthly Delights, a painting by Hieronymus Bosch